Sir Colin Henry Imray  (1933–2020) was a British diplomat who was High Commissioner to Tanzania and Bangladesh.

Biography
Colin Imray was educated at Highgate School, Hotchkiss School, Connecticut, and Balliol College, Oxford.

He served in the Seaforth Highlanders and the Royal West African Frontier Force in Sierra Leone 1952–54, then joined the Commonwealth Relations Office in 1957. After diplomatic postings in Canberra, Nairobi and Montreal, he was Consul-General at Islamabad 1973–77, Commercial Counsellor at Tel Aviv 1977–80, Deputy High Commissioner at Bombay (now Mumbai) 1980–84, Assistant Under-Secretary of State at the FCO 1984–85, High Commissioner to Tanzania 1986–89 and High Commissioner to Bangladesh 1989–93.

Imray was appointed CMG in 1983 and knighted KBE in 1992.

References

1933 births
2020 deaths
People educated at Highgate School
Hotchkiss School alumni
Alumni of Balliol College, Oxford
Members of HM Diplomatic Service
High Commissioners of the United Kingdom to Tanzania
High Commissioners of the United Kingdom to Bangladesh
Knights Commander of the Order of the British Empire
Companions of the Order of St Michael and St George